is a former Japanese football player.

Playing career
Endo was born in Chiba Prefecture on March 31, 1980. After graduating from high school, he joined the Japan Football League club Tokyo Gas (later FC Tokyo) in 1998. The club was promoted to the J2 League in 1999 and the J1 League in 2000. However, he did not play in many matches, and fewer than the goalkeeper Yoichi Doi until 2006. In 2007, he moved to the J2 club Montedio Yamagata. The club was promoted to J1 in 2009. However he did not play much. In 2010, he moved to the Japan Football League club Sony Sendai. Although he played several matches in 2010, he did not play at all in 2011 and retired at the end of the 2011 season.

Club statistics

References

External links

1980 births
Living people
Association football people from Chiba Prefecture
Japanese footballers
J1 League players
J2 League players
Japan Football League (1992–1998) players
Japan Football League players
FC Tokyo players
Montedio Yamagata players
Sony Sendai FC players
Association football goalkeepers